Michael P. McAuliffe (born December 7, 1963) is a former Republican member of the Illinois House of Representatives, representing the 20th district in northwestern Chicago. He was first appointed in 1997, following the death of his father, Roger McAuliffe; between them, the McAuliffes represented northwestern Chicago for 46 years. On June 17, 2019, McAuliffe resigned from the Illinois House of Representatives. He was the only Republican to represent a significant portion of Chicago in the Illinois General Assembly. On June 29, 2019, Republican Bradley Stephens, the Mayor of Rosemont, was appointed to succeed McAuliffe.

References

External links
Biography, bills and committees at the 98th Illinois General Assembly
Previous sessions: 97th, 96th, 95th, 94th,  93rd
Michael P. McAuliffe at the Illinois House Republican Caucus
 

Republican Party members of the Illinois House of Representatives
1963 births
Living people
Politicians from Chicago
Triton College alumni
21st-century American politicians